is a 1990 shoot 'em up video game developed and published by Konami for the Game Boy. It is part of the Gradius series. Similar to Taito's Sagaia, this game uses a once-international title for an earlier game in the series to represent a mostly original project.

A sequel, Nemesis II, was released for the same platform in 1991. Both games were later rereleased through the Konami GB Collection series, where they are titled Gradius and Gradius II instead.

Gameplay
Nemesis retains the basic power-up meter commonly used in most Gradius games, but with the addition of multi-level missiles not present in the original Gradius.

The game consists of only five stages, each with a unique core boss. Although it is also possible to access hidden bonus stages in which the player may collect 1-ups and score bonus cells. Like other Game Boy titles developed by Konami, the game presents the player with a stage selection screen before starting.

1990 video games
Game Boy games
Game Boy-only games
Gradius video games
Video games developed in Japan
Video games scored by Michiru Yamane
Horizontally scrolling shooters

ja:ネメシス (ゲーム)#ネメシス